Norah Alupo (born 2000 or 2001) is a Ugandan footballer who plays as a winger for FUFA Women Super League club Lady Doves FC and the Uganda women's national team.

Club career 
Alupo has played for Bunyaruguru Girls WFC and Lady Daves in Uganda.

International career 
Alupo capped for Uganda at senior level during the 2021 COSAFA Women's Championship.

International goals
Scores and results list Uganda goal tally first

References

External links 
 

2000s births
Living people
Ugandan women's footballers
Women's association football wingers
Uganda women's international footballers
21st-century Ugandan women